Thomas Foxcroft may refer to:
 Thomas Foxcroft (minister)
 Thomas Foxcroft (slave trader)